John Frederick Portland (July 30, 1912 – August 15, 1996) was a Canadian ice hockey defenceman and athlete. He played in the National Hockey League for the Montreal Canadiens, Boston Bruins, and Chicago Black Hawks from 1933 to 1943. He also participated in the high jump and triple jump events at the 1932 Summer Olympics in Los Angeles. Portland was born in Collingwood, Ontario.

Career statistics

Regular season and playoffs

Awards and achievements
Can-Am First All-Star Team (1936)

References

External links
 

1912 births
1996 deaths
Athletes (track and field) at the 1930 British Empire Games
Athletes (track and field) at the 1932 Summer Olympics
Boston Bruins players
Boston Cubs players
Boston Tigers (CAHL) players
Buffalo Bisons (AHL) players
Canadian ice hockey defencemen
Canadian male high jumpers
Canadian male triple jumpers
Canadian military personnel of World War II
Chicago Blackhawks players
Commonwealth Games competitors for Canada
Ice hockey people from Simcoe County
Montreal Canadiens players
Olympic track and field athletes of Canada
Ontario Hockey Association Senior A League (1890–1979) players
Philadelphia Rockets players
Stanley Cup champions
Track and field athletes from Ontario
Washington Lions players
Sportspeople from Collingwood, Ontario
Canadian expatriate ice hockey players in the United States
20th-century Canadian people